The prokineticin receptor is a G protein-coupled receptor which binds the peptide hormone prokineticin.  There are two variants each encoded by a different gene (PROKR1, PROKR2).  These receptors mediate gastrointestinal smooth muscle contraction and angiogenesis.

References

External links

 
 

G protein-coupled receptors